The following are summaries of episodes of the children's series Angela Anaconda, in order of broadcast.  The summaries are split by each 11-minute story, which originally aired with another story in a 22-minute episode. Angela Anaconda originally aired for three seasons, from 1999 to 1901. Altogether the series had 65 episodes.

Series overview

Episodes

KaBlam! shorts (1996)
Angela Anaconda first appeared two shorts in the first season of Kablam!. "Chew On This" appeared in "Untitled (Why June Refuses To Turn Page?)", while "First Flush of Love" appeared in "Comics of Champions". Due to copyrights being held with Fox, the episodes featuring her shorts are currently not allowed to air on Nicktoons.

Season 1 (1999)

Season 2 (2000–01)

Season 3 (2001)

Notes

References

External links 
 

Lists of Canadian children's animated television series episodes
Lists of American children's animated television series episodes
KaBlam!